is the eighth single by Japanese recording artist Aya Ueto. It was released on June 16, 2004 as the first single from Ueto's third studio album Re..

Overview

"Kaze/Okuru Kotoba" is a double A-side single released as the first of two back-to-back singles. The single was issued in CD+DVD format only. The DVD features the music videos for both A-sides. Like "Ai no Tame ni." before it, "Kaze" was composed by Tetsurō Oda, however this time the lyrics were written by Yoshiko Miura and the track arranged by Nobuyuki Shimizu. The song served as ending theme for the 12th season (80 episodes) of the long-running educational anime series Nintama Rantarō, which aired from April 5 to July 23, 2004. The chorus of the song features the vocals of the unit Kotsubu-gumi, which consists of the three youngest members of the idol group Bishōjo Club 31. Barks described the sound of "Kaze" as "Shōwa reggae," while CDJournal called it a "fun Okinawan-chic pop song" and complimented Ueto's "steady" vocal delivery.

The second A-side is a cover of the Tetsuya Takeda-led folk group Kaientai's 1979 hit "Okuru Kotoba." The cover, which was initially recorded for Ueto's second studio album Message, was released as an A-side after being chosen as the theme song for the video game adaption of the TBS drama 3-nen B-gumi Kinpachi-sensei. The single version is a newly arranged acoustic rendition of the song. At a press conference for the video game, Ueto and Takeda, who starred together in the sixth season of the series, performed a duet of the song.

Chart performance
"Kaze/Okuru Kotoba" debuted on the Oricon Daily Singles chart at number 6 and climbed to number 5 the following day. It peaked at number 8 on the Oricon Weekly Singles chart, with 21,927 copies sold in its first week. The single charted for ten weeks and has sold a total of 44,240 copies.

Track listing

Charts

Release history

References

2004 singles
Aya Ueto songs
Songs written by Tetsurō Oda